The Financial Services Act 2012 is an Act of the Parliament of the United Kingdom which implements a new regulatory framework for the financial system and financial services in the UK. It replaces the Financial Services Authority with two new regulators, namely the Financial Conduct Authority and the Prudential Regulation Authority, and creates the Financial Policy Committee of the Bank of England. This framework went into effect on 1 April 2013.

Its main effect is to amend the Financial Services and Markets Act 2000.

Provisions
Under the Act, the administration of Libor became a regulated activity overseen by the Financial Conduct Authority. Knowingly or deliberately making false or misleading statements in relation to benchmark-setting became a criminal offence. Laws relating to charitable industrial and provident societies were revised.

See also

UK company law
EU law

Notes

External links
 UK Government Press Release
 UK Government Policy: Improving regulation of the financial sector to protect customers and the economy
 UK Parliament Committee debates Libor and the Financial Services Act
 UK Parliament Bills & legislation

Financial regulation in the United Kingdom
United Kingdom Acts of Parliament 2012